Mad Youth is a 1940 American film directed by Melville Shyer. The film is also known as Girls of the Underworld (American reissue title).

Plot summary 
Divorcée Marian Morgan (Compson) hires a male escort Count DeHoven (Willy Castello), who has an affair with her teenage daughter, Mary (Ainslee).

After her wild parties, with jitterbugs and strip poker, Helen's grandmother (Fealy), locks her out of the house, and she runs away to marry a man she met through correspondence.

Marian gets fed up with her daughter and her friends. She laments that she never got to be young, and free, like they are; and, tells her daughter to go live with her father for a while. Mary doesn't get along with his new wife; so, she decides to go visit Helen, after getting a letter, from her.

The "Count" is furious with Marian, for letting her daughter traipse across the country, without knowing who she is with; and, warns her that mail-order marriage scams can be one of the worst traps there is. Together they track down an address, and he hurries to try to save Mary and Helen (Atkinson).

The girls have been imprisoned in a prostitution and white slavery ring, in a big old mansion. It was all a ruse; and, Helen was beaten until she gave in, and wrote to send for her friend.

Time is running out. It looks like there's going to be a fight, if the “Count” is going to save Mary, and marry her, before she disappears into the underworld, forever.

Cast 
Mary Ainslee as Marian Morgan
Betty Compson as Lucy Morgan
Willy Castello as Count DeHoven
Betty Atkinson as Helen Johnson
Tommy Wonder as Harry
Lorelei Readoux as Beth
Margaret Fealy as Helen's Grandmother
Donald Kerr as Taxi Driver
Ray Hirsch as Jitter Bug
Patti Lacey as Jitter Bug
Eugene Taylor as Jitter Bug
Aileen Morris as Jitter Bug
Maxine Taylor as Jitter Bug
Pearl Tolson as Jitter Bug
Monte Collins as Melancholy Brige Player

Soundtrack 
"I'd Rather Be a Bum on Broadway Than an Angel in the Sky"

References

External links 

1940 films
American crime drama films
1940s exploitation films
American black-and-white films
1940 crime drama films
Films directed by Melville Shyer
1940s English-language films
1940s American films